Face Off (Chinese: 这样是怎样？) is a talk show produced by Mediacorp Channel U. It is hosted by a rotating team of presenters composed of two from a team of the five hosts Kate Pang, Danny Yeo, Quan Yi Fong, Dasmond Koh and Youyi. Every week, there are 4 to 5 invited guests from different sectors of the society who will carry out a discussion on different social topics. The show begins with a re-enactment of a situation to bring out the social dilemma of the weekly topic. Hosts will then engage in an in-depth discussion and debate with the guests. There will also be live audience participation to allow public opinions to be heard.

Accolades

See also
Mediacorp Channel U
List of programmes broadcast by Channel U (Singapore)

Mandarin-language television shows
Mediacorp Chinese language programmes
Television talk shows
Singaporean television series
2015 Singaporean television seasons
2015 Singaporean television series debuts
2015 Singaporean television series endings
Channel U (Singapore) original programming